The Emblem of His Majesty the King of the Ashanti (or National Emblem of Ashanti) is the national emblem of the Ashanti nation, adopted by the Ashanti King Asantehene Osei Tutu I in 1701, and depicts a Porcupine, which has been the Ashanti national animal since the early-eighteenth century AD.

Emblem origin
The Porcupine, as the Ashanti national emblem has been used by the Asantehene, the king of the Ashanti people, since 1701. The Porcupine is the designated national animal of the Ashanti. The national emblem was created by Asantehene Nana Osei Kofi Tutu I (r. 1695 – 1717).

Emblem description
The Ashanti national emblem is a red Porcupine (or Ashanti: Kotoko) on a gold background that symbolizes gold which has been a source of Ashanti wealth. The Porcupine has been the designated national animal of the Ashanti since 1701 right through to the 21st century and stems from the Ashanti proverb:"The porcupine fights from all angles" and the readiness of the Ashanti nation to wage war on its enemies with the Ashanti nation motto "Kum apem a, apem beba" (Kill a thousand, a thousand will rise) in reference to the Porcupine's quills as symbols of Ashanti warriors, is still quoted.

See also 
Political systems of the Ashanti Empire

References

Ashanti
Ashanti people